A sachet  is a small scented cloth bag filled with herbs, potpourri, or aromatic ingredients. A sachet is also a small porous bag or packet containing a material intended to interact with its atmosphere;  for example, desiccants are usually packed in sachets which are then placed in larger packages.

Cultural history 
During the Chinese Warring States period a scented sachet (xiangbao) was an ornament worn on the body and used to absorb sweat, repel insects and ward off evils.
In medieval Europe the sachet was known as a "plague-bag". 

In various Indian cuisines, a "potli bag" is used to contain whole spices, so that they may be easily separated from the food after cooking.  They are also used as fashion ornaments unto themselves.

References

Sources 

 Black, Penny, The book of potpourri: fragrant flower mixes for scenting & decorating the home, Simon and Schuster, 1989, 
 Bond, Annie B., Home Enlightenment: Practical, Earth-Friendly Advice for Creating a Nurturing, Healthy, and Toxin-Free Home and Lifestyle, Rodale, 2005, 
 Booth, Nancy M., Perfumes, splashes & colognes: discovering & crafting your personal fragrances, Storey Publishing, 1997, 
 Buchanan, Rita, Taylor's guide to herbs, Houghton Mifflin, 1995, 
 BUREAU OF AMERICAN ETHNOLOGY, published 1930
 Calbom, Cherie, The Juice Lady's Guide to Juicing for Health, Avery, 2000, 
 Chopra, Deepak, A sachet of hops is traditionally placed under a child's pillow to deliver sleep-inducing aromatherapy., Random House, Inc., 2000, 
 Cox, Janice, Natural beauty from the garden: more than 200 do-it-yourself beauty recipes and garden ideas, Macmillan, 1999, 
 Duff, Gail, Natural Fragrances: Outdoor Scents for Indoor Uses, Storey Publishing, LLC, 1991, 
 Fettner, Ann Tucker, Potpourri, incense, and other fragrant concoctions, Workman Pub. Co., 1977, 
 Fleming Charles, Royal dictionary, English and French and French and English, Volume 2, Firmin-Didot and Company, 1885
 Foster, Steven, National Geographic Desk Reference to Nature's Medicine, National Geographic Books, 2008, 
 Freeman, Sally, Ageless Natural Beauty, Barnes & Noble Publishing, 2002, 
 Garland, Sarah, The Complete Book of Herbs and Spices, frances lincoln ltd, 2004, 
 Gasc, Ferdinand E. A., Dictionary of the French and English languages: with more than fifteen thousand new words, meanings, etc.., H. Holt and Company, 1876
 Hemphill, Rosemary, Fragrance and flavour: the growing and use of herbs, Angus and Robertson, 1960, Pennsylvania State University
 Hills, William Henry, The Writer, Volume 6, The Writer, 1893
 Hunter, Robert, Universal dictionary of the English language: a new and original work presenting for convenient reference the orthography, pronunciation, meaning, use, origin and development of every word in the English language ..., P. F. Collier, 1897
 Knapp, Jennifer, Beauty Magic: 101 Recipes, Spells, and Secrets , Chronicle Books, 2004, 
 Kothe, Erika B, Jewels from Heaven , iUniverse, 2004, 
 Lust, John, The Natural Remedy Bible, Simon and Schuster, 2003, 
 Mitrea, MD (Eur), ND Liliana Stadler, Natural medicine mosaic, Natural Medicine Books, 2007, 
 Murphy-Hiscock, Arin, The way of the green witch: rituals, spells, and practices to bring you back to nature, Adams Media, 2006, 
 Oster, Maggie, Ortho's all about herbs, Meredith Books, 1999, 
 Pereira, Jonathan, Title The Elements of Materia Medica and Therapeutics: including notices of most of the medical substandces in use in the civilized world, and forming an Encyclopaedia of Materia Medica, Volume 1, Longman, 1854
 Rohde, Eleanour Sinclair, Rose Recipes from Olden Times, Courier Dover Publications, 1973, 
 Rose, Jeanne, Herbs & Things: Jeanne Rose's Herbal, Last Gasp, 2002, 
 Seton, Susannah, Simple Pleasures of the Home: Comforts and Crafts for Living Well, Conari, 2002, 
 Simmonds, Peter Lund, The dictionary of trade products, manufacturing, and technical terms: with a definition of the moneys, weights, and measures of all countries, G. Routledge, 1858
 Sisko, Eileen, Nature power then and now, Mason County Historical Society, 1984, 
 Strobell, Adah Parker, Like it was: Bicentennial games 'n fun handbook, Acropolis Books, 1975, 
 Sweringen, Hiram V., A dictionary of pharmaceutical science: a guide for the pharmaceutist, druggist, and physician..., P. Blakiston, 1882
 Walter, John T., hints & pinches, Hill Street Press, 2002, 
 Webster, Helen, Herbs – How to Grow Them and How to Use Them, READ BOOKS, 2008, 
 White, Susan, Herbs Teach Yourself Book, NTC Pub. Group, 1993, 
 Williamson, Karen, Sleep Deep: Simple Techniques for Beating Insomnia '', Perigee, 2007, 

Medical hygiene
Toiletry
Perfumery
Culture in Cologne
Economy of Cologne
Perfumes
Personal hygiene products
Packaging